The Seven Mile Journey is a Danish post-rock band. They have worked with instrumental music since 1999, which also characterizes their debut album The Journey Studies. The basis of their music is dynamic shifts, gloomy sounds, and long and intense sound surfaces, which invite the listener to absorption.

Discography

Demo
2001 - The Seven Mile Journey
 In an Eight Track Universe 	
 The Mystery of Olden 	
 Distant March 	
 When Blizzards are Afraid

Full-length

2006 - The Journey Studies
 Through the Alter Ego Justifications
 Passenger's Log, the Unity Fractions
 Theme for the Oddmory Philosophies
 The Murderer/Victim Monologues

2008 - The Metamorphosis Project
 Theme for the Elthenbury Massacre	
 The Catharsis Session
 Identity Journals (anonymous)	
 January 4 - The Hypothesis Hours
 A Sanctuary for Lugubrious Tracy
 Purification - The Journey Transcriptions

2011 - Notes for the Synthesis
 Departures
 The Alter Ego Autopsies
 Simplicity Has a Paradox
 The Engram Dichotomy
 Transits
 The Etiology Diaries

2016 - Templates for Mimesis
 Substitutes for Oblivion
 The Axiom Anomaly
 Causalities
 The Oddmory Principle
 Tutorials

External links 
Official site

Danish post-rock groups
Danish rock music groups